Salvia amplexicaulis is a herbaceous perennial that is native to southeastern Europe. It is a close relative of Salvia nemorosa. Its specific epithet, amplexicaulis, refers to the "stem-clasping" stem leaves which have no stalks.

Notes

amplexicaulis
Flora of Europe
Taxa named by Jean-Baptiste Lamarck